Callistocythere elegans is a species of ostracods. It is from the Gulf of Naples, Italy.

References

 Callistocythere elegans at WoRMS

Podocopida
Crustaceans described in 1894
Fauna of Italy